Bayou II Township is an inactive township in Ozark County, in the U.S. state of Missouri.

Bayou II Township takes its name from Bayou Creek within its borders.

References

Townships in Missouri
Townships in Ozark County, Missouri